Rebecca Donovan  is an American novelist.  Her books have a special appeal to twenty-somethings, a market category publishers call new adult.

Donovan, who had previously worked as an events planner, began as a self-published author, but in 2012, Penguin acquired the U.K. rights to her successful "Breathing" series.  In 2013 she signed a contract with the Amazon.com imprint, Skyscape Publishing.  According to the Boston Globe, to celebrate her publishing contract with Amazon, Donovan "took over" the Blithewold Mansion where she planned and held a party together with friends she had worked together with at Rafanelli Events .

Bibliography

Novels
Reason to Breathe    Reason to Breathe, was listed on the USA Today bestseller list in August, 2012.
Barely Breathing 
Out of Breath   Out of Breath was # 4 on the list of all booksellers, nationwide the week it was published in July, 2013. It was # 6 on the young adult and children bestseller list for 2013 at Amazon.com, the nation's largest volume bookseller. Out of Breath was # 4 on the list of all booksellers, nationwide the week it was published in July, 2013. It was also published as an audio book.
What If

References

External links
 

Living people
21st-century American novelists
Women romantic fiction writers
Self-published books
American women novelists
Writers from Rhode Island
Year of birth missing (living people)
21st-century American women writers
American romantic fiction novelists